Alberni-Pacific Rim is a provincial electoral district in British Columbia, Canada, established by the Electoral Districts Act, 2008. It came into effect upon the next dissolution of the BC Legislature in April 2009. It was first contested in the 2009 election, and after a redistribution in 2015 much of the riding became Mid Island-Pacific Rim.

Electoral history

References

British Columbia provincial electoral districts on Vancouver Island
Port Alberni